Erythromycin 12 hydroxylase (EryK) is an enzyme with systematic name erythromycin-D,NADPH:oxygen oxidoreductase (12-hydroxylating) . This enzyme catalyses the following chemical reaction

 erythromycin D + NADPH + H+ + O2  erythromycin C + NADP+ + H2O

Erythromycin 12 hydroxylase is responsible for the C-12 hydroxylation of the macrolactone ring.

References

External links 
 

EC 1.14.13